Tavleøya (English: Slate Island) is one of  Sjuøyane, north of Nordaustlandet. The island lies about 1 km west of the northern point of Phippsøya, separated by Marmorsundet (English: The Marble Sound), and about 7 km south of Vesle Tavleøya. Two smaller skerries to the northwest of Tavleøya are named Kluftholmen.

References

Norwegian Polar Institute Place Names of Svalbard Database

Islands of Svalbard
Skerries